Andrey Olegovich Kavun is a Russian film director and screenwriter of Ukrainian origin, notable for historical drama film Kandahar. In 1999 he graduated from the directing department of VGIK (workshop of Vladimir Khotinenko).

Filmography

References

External links 
 Andrey Kavun personal web-site 

1969 births
Living people
Film people from Lviv
Russian people of Ukrainian descent
Russian film directors
Ukrainian film directors
Gerasimov Institute of Cinematography alumni